The 1983 Kent State Golden Flashes football team was an American football team that represented Kent State University in the Mid-American Conference (MAC) during the 1983 NCAA Division I-A football season. In their first season under head coach Dick Scesniak, the Golden Flashes compiled a 1–10 record (1–8 against MAC opponents), finished in ninth place in the MAC, and were outscored by all opponents by a combined total of 260 to 157.

The team's statistical leaders included O.D. Underwood with 531 rushing yards, Stu Rayburn with 1,461 passing yards, and Ken Hughes with 575 receiving yards.

Schedule

References

Kent State
Kent State Golden Flashes football seasons
Kent State Golden Flashes football